Campfire Tales may refer to:
 Campfire Tales (1991 film), an American anthology horror film
 Campfire Tales (1997 film), an American anthology horror film